Marat Bisengaliev (born 1962 in Kazakhstan) is a Kazakh violinist and conductor of both the West Kazakhstan Philharmonic Orchestra and TuranAlem Kazakhstan Philharmonic Orchestra. He is the founding Music Director of the Symphony Orchestra of India. In addition, he is head of the Uralsk International Violin Competition. Most of the time he lives and works in the UK and India.

Bisengaliev is also the father of singer Aruhan Galieva.

Biography 
1969 – Marat entered the K. Bayseitov Republican Secondary Special Music School as a violinist and graduated from it in 1979.

1979–1981 – Kurmangazy Alma-Ata State Conservatoire.

1981–1984 – Moscow State Tchaikovsky Conservatory.

1986–1988 – Bisengaliev is doing postgraduate studies in Moscow Conservatory.

Marat Bisengaliev finished studies by a major solo concert on the stage in the Great Hall of the Moscow State Tchaikovsky Conservatory with The Russia State Academic Symphony Orchestra of the USSR, where he successfully performed Beethoven's violin concerto.

1990 – He moved to England.

1990 – Marriage to a British flutist Stine Wilson. They had a daughter Aruhan Galieva (1991) – a British singer and actress, a member of the National Youth Theatre.  Aruhan appeared in Joe Wright's film adaptation of Anna Karenina. In 2015 she made her professional theatre debut at The Globe as Blanche of Castille in James Dacre's production of "King John". After the divorce from Stine Wilson, Bisengaliev married to a Frenchwoman Vassilia. They have a daughter, Shorai.

They live in the small town of Oxspring, South Yorkshire, near Sheffield.

Anthology of Edward Elgar 
Bisengaliev lived for three years in the small town of Malvern Hills, Worcestershire, England, where the famous English composer Edward Elgar (1857–1934) was born. He was invited there as a "musician in the residence." But he also worked there as a scientist, visited libraries and houses related to Elgar, collected all possible materials about him and recorded a complete anthology of his works. The first two discs of this album were recorded in 1999 and 2001. To this release, the violinist added another third disc recently, which he recorded together with the West Kazakhstan Philharmonic Orchestra in 2010. And in 2011 he released the full anthology of Elgar in his performance on the triple CD "Elgar / Elgar". The violinist still regards this as his most significant achievement.

Career 
1989 – Bisengaliev created a chamber orchestra "Altyn-Alma" in Alma-Ata. In the same year he was invited touring England. At one of the concerts, Marat performed a violin concert by Jean Sibelius and shocked listeners with his emotional emancipation and depth of interpretation. David Danton, a producer of the record company "Naxos", on the same day offered the violinist a contract for recording his concert repertoire. In the following years (1992–2008) Bisengaliev recorded fourteen compact discs with the largest Western record companies, such as "Naxos", "Marco Polo", "Sony", "EMR – Classic", "Black Boxing".

He was a prize winner at the Leipzig International Bach Competition in 1988, and in 1991 won first prize at the International Nicanor Zabaleta Competition in Spain, also receiving the special virtuoso prize for the most outstanding performance of the competition.

2000 – received the Independent "Platinum Tarlan" Award and the Government "Medal of Honour" in Kazakhstan.

2003 – founded the West Kazakhstan Philharmonic Orchestra.

2006 – became Artistic Director of the Symphony Orchestra of India, the first professional Symphony Orchestra in India.

2010 – became member of Directors of AAPRO (Alliance of Asia Pacific Regions Orchestra).

In response to the Borat movie, Bisengaliev commissioned a symphony called "Zere" from Erran Baron Cohen, the musical director of the movie (and brother of Borat star Sacha Baron Cohen).

Marat Bisengaliev has given concerts in over 35 countries and performed with such famous orchestras as Northern Simfonia, Moscow State Tchaikovsky Conservatory, Polish National Radio Symphony Orchestra, Warsaw Philharmonic Orchestra, National Symphony Orchestra of Ukraine. Marat performed in the most prestigious concert halls in the world: Carnegie Hall (New York City), Royal Albert Hall, Barbican Hall and Wigmore Hall (London), (Manchester), (Belfast), Great Hall of the Moscow Conservatory, etc.

Rewards and premiums 
1988 – a prizewinner of the International Bach Competition in Leipzig ( (Germany)).

1991 – won the first prize at the International Nicanor Zabaleta Competition, Spain. In addition to the first place received a special prize for the most virtuosic performance.

2000 – Honored Artist of Kazakhstan.

2000 – the Order "Kurmet" ("Order of Honor") from the government of Kazakhstan.

2000 – the first laureate of the Independent Award of patrons of Kazakhstan "Platinum Tarlan".

2010 – was elected as "The Music Symbol of the Decade of Kazakhstan" based on the results of an independent poll.

Discography 
1992 – LALO, Symphonie espagnole (Lalo, Sarasate, Ravel, Saint-Saëns) with the Polish Symphony Orchestra, Naxos

1992 – WIENIAWSKI, Violin Showpieces (Henryk Wieniawski's violin sketches), Naxos

1993 – BRIAN CYRCLE (Concerto for Violin and Symphony No. 18 by Brian Havergal), Naxos / Marco Polo

1994 – BRAHMS / JOACHIM (Hungarian Brahms dances and Joachim's romances), Naxos

1995 – WIENIAWSKI (Concerts for Violin No. 1 and 2 by Henryk Wieniawski), Naxos

1996 – MENDELSSOHN (Two concerts by Felix Mendelssohn for violin and orchestra), Naxos

1998 – DUET (Mendelssohn's double concert for violinist and pianist with Jania Aubakirova in Barbican Hall, London).

1999 – ELGAR Rediscovered works for violin (Newly discovered works for violin by Edward Elgar), Black Box, (nomination for the Prize of Gramophone magazine, England)

1999 – BRAHMS (Three Brahms sonatas for piano and violin), Black Box

2001 – ELGAR Rediscovered works for violin, vol.2 (Newly discovered works for violin by Edward Elgar, volume 2), Black Box

2005 – A. RUBINSTEIN (Trio No. 3 by Anton Rubinstein for piano, cello, violin with orchestra, etc.), "Melody"

2005 – KARL JENKINS, Requiem (M. Bisengaliev – violin and West Kazakhstan Philharmonic Orchestra, DK K. Jenkins), EMI Classics, (No.1 in Classic Sales Chart and No.1 in "Classic" in Classic FM Magazine)

2006 – Havergal Brian, Violin Concerto (M. Bisengaliev – violin and BBC Scottish Symphony Orchestra, dir Lionel Friend), Naxos

2006 – Karl Jenkins, Tlep (M. Bisengaliev – violin and West Kazakhstan Philharmonic Orchestra, DK K. Jenkins), Sony BMG, (Gold Disc from Sony BMG)

2008 – Karl Jenkins, Quirk, including a concert for violin Sarikiz (M. Bisengaliev – violin and London Symphony Orchestra, K. K. Jenkins), EMI Classics

2011 – "Elgar / Elgar" (triple CD, full anthology)

Books 
2011 – the autobiographical book "Do ... Re ..."

Interesting facts 
Marat Bisengaliev is a citizen of Kazakhstan, despite the fact that he has been living in England for 20 years.

His family lives on the Island of Crete. He has got houses in England, Almaty, Uralsk, Bombay, New Zealand.

The New York Times says that "he has taken to heart a style of playing that was a hallmark of violin virtuosity early in the century".

He has made a number of well-received discs for Naxos and on the evidence of this most enjoyable anthology is a violinist of great technical accomplishment and communicative warmth, and he generates a really fine rapport with the admirable Benjamin Frith.

External links
 Official Website

Kazakhstani classical violinists
Kazakhstani conductors (music)
1962 births
Living people
21st-century conductors (music)
21st-century classical violinists